Siegfried IV was the last Count of Northeim-Boyneburg and Homburg. He gave the land at Amelungsborn for the foundation (in the 12th century) of the future Amelungsborn Abbey, a Cistercian monastery, which was officially settled by a community of monks from Altenkamp Abbey.

References

12th-century German nobility